Greatest Hits is the first compilation album by American country music singer Suzy Bogguss. It was released on March 8, 1994 via Liberty Records. Eight of her Top 40 singles are here including her Grammy-nominated duet with Lee Greenwood, previously available only on his own A Perfect 10 album. Her first two singles from Somewhere Between are included as well, even though neither reached Top 40.

Track listing

Production 
 Producer(s): Wendy Waldman, Jimmy Bowen, Suzy Bogguss, Jerry Crutchfield
 Liner Notes: Patsi Cox

Chart performance

Certifications 
RIAA Certification

Release details 

Suzy Bogguss albums
1994 greatest hits albums
Liberty Records compilation albums